Father Aloysius H. Schmitt (December 4, 1909 – December 7, 1941) was a Roman Catholic priest of the Archdiocese of Dubuque, who served as a chaplain in the United States Navy at the beginning of World War II.

Early life and ordination
Born in St. Lucas, Iowa to Henry and Mary Anna (Kuennen) Schmitt, Schmitt studied at Columbia College (now Loras College) in Dubuque, Iowa and graduated in 1932. He then studied in Rome for the priesthood.  He was ordained on December 8, 1935.  Father Schmitt was first assigned as an associate at Saint Mary's Church in Dubuque.  He was also assigned to St. Mary's Cathedral in Cheyenne, Wyoming.  After four years, he received permission to become a chaplain, and joined the United States Navy. He was appointed Acting Chaplain with rank of Lieutenant, Junior Grade (LTJG) on June 28, 1939.

Military service and death
On December 7, 1941, Fr. Schmitt was serving on board the battleship USS Oklahoma during the Japanese attack on Pearl Harbor, when a hit caused the ship to capsize.  A number of sailors, including Fr. Schmitt, were trapped in a compartment with only a small porthole as the means of escape.  Fr. Schmitt helped a number of men through this porthole.  When it came his time to leave, he declined and helped more men escape. In total, he helped 12 men escape.

Fr. Schmitt died on board the  Oklahoma, and was the first chaplain from USA of any faith to have died in World War II.  Most of the bodies were recovered after the ship was righted in 1943.  His remains were originally buried in a cemetery in Hawaii as an "Unknown." In 1944, the Navy presented a specially made crucifix to the Archdiocese of Dubuque, in honor of Chaplain Schmitt. It was 24 inches tall and was made from the teakwood deck of the Oklahoma. The corpus of Christ on the crucifix was shaped from the ship's metal. The presentation was made by the chief of chaplains, 8th Naval district.

In 2015 the United States Department of Defense exhumed the remains of what were believed to be 388 military personnel.  Schmitt's remains were identified in 2016 from DNA taken from his skull and matched with that of a relative. They were returned to Iowa where a Memorial Mass was celebrated in his home parish of St. Luke in St. Lucas on October 5, 2016.  His remains were transferred to Dubuque where a funeral Mass and burial were held in Christ the King Chapel at Loras College on October 8, 2016.

Posthumous honors
Fr. Schmitt was honored posthumously by the U.S. government when it awarded him the Navy and Marine Corps Medal and Purple Heart. On December 7, 2017 he was awarded the Silver Star.
 St. Francis Xavier Chapel at Camp Lejeune was dedicated in his memory in 1942.
A destroyer escort named USS Schmitt was commissioned in 1943 by the Navy in his honor and served the U.S. Navy until 1967, when it was transferred to Taiwan.
Christ the King Chapel at Loras College was dedicated in his memory in 1947 and contains some of Fr. Schmitt's personal effects that had been recovered from the Oklahoma — including his chalice and prayer book — and other items that were donated to the school. Present at the dedication were Cardinal Samuel Stritch of Chicago and Admiral Chester Nimitz, commander of the Pacific Fleet during World War II.
City Island, in the Mississippi River near Dubuque (formerly known as Ham's Island, after Mathias Ham who once owned it) was renamed Chaplain Schmitt Memorial Island. It is the location of Dubuque Greyhound Park and Casino.

See also

Roman Catholic priests
Military chaplain
United States Navy
USS Oklahoma
USS Schmitt

References

1909 births
1941 deaths
People from Fayette County, Iowa
American people of German descent
Catholics from Iowa
Loras College alumni
Roman Catholic Archdiocese of Dubuque
20th-century American Roman Catholic priests
United States Navy officers
United States Navy chaplains
World War II chaplains
United States Navy personnel killed in World War II
Deaths by Japanese airstrikes during the attack on Pearl Harbor
Recipients of the Navy and Marine Corps Medal
Recipients of the Silver Star
Military personnel from Iowa